Dr. Madhav Prasad Shastri is an Indian politician and member of the Bharatiya Janata Party. Shastri is a member of the Madhya Pradesh Legislative Assembly from the Tarana constituency in Ujjain district.

References 

People from Ujjain
Bharatiya Janshakti Party politicians
Bharatiya Janata Party politicians from Madhya Pradesh
Madhya Pradesh MLAs 1993–1998
Living people
21st-century Indian politicians
Year of birth missing (living people)